The men's hammer throw event was part of the track and field athletics programme at the 1936 Summer Olympics. The competition was held on August 3, 1936. There were 27 competitors from 16 nations. The maximum number of athletes per nation had been set at 3 since the 1930 Olympic Congress. The final was won by Karl Hein of Germany. The silver medal went to Erwin Blask, also of Germany. They were the first medals for Germany in the event; Germany was also the first country other than the United States to have two medalists in the event in the same Games. Fred Warngård of Sweden took bronze. The United States' eight-Games medal streak in the hammer throw was snapped, with the Americans' best result being William Rowe's fifth place.

Background

This was the ninth appearance of the event, which has been held at every Summer Olympics except 1896. One of the six finalists from the 1932 Games returned: silver medalist Ville Pörhölä of Finland, who had also won the shot put in 1920. Two-time defending champion Pat O'Callaghan of Ireland would have competed and been favored to match John Flanagan's three gold medals, but disputes over the status of sport governing bodies on the island of Ireland resulted in the Olympic Federation of Ireland boycotting the 1936 Games.

Austria, Czechoslovakia, Estonia, Greece, and Yugoslavia each made their debut in the event. The United States appeared for the ninth time, the only nation to have competed at each appearance of the event to that point.

Competition format

The competition introduced a true two-round format, with the qualifying round completely separate from the divided final (though the official report describes the competition as having three phases, with the final being a "semi-finals" and "final"). In qualifying, each athlete received three attempts; those recording a mark of at least 46.00 metres advanced to the final. The results of the qualifying round were then ignored. Finalists received three throws each, with the top six competitors receiving an additional three attempts. The best distance among those six throws counted.

Records

These were the standing world and Olympic records (in metres) prior to the 1936 Summer Olympics.

Erwin Blask set a new Olympic record with 55.04 metres in his second throw of the final. Fred Warngård beat the old record in his fourth throw, but was still behind Blask. Karl Hein won the gold medal with a new Olympic record throw of 56.49 metres in his last throw of the competition.

Schedule

Results

Qualifying

Final

References

Athletics at the 1936 Summer Olympics
Hammer throw at the Olympics
Men's events at the 1936 Summer Olympics